Keshava is an epithet of the Hindu god Vishnu.

Keshava (IAST: Keśava) may also refer to:

 Keshava of Nandigrama, 15th-16th century astronomer and astrologer
 Keshava (musician) (born 2003), Indian tabla player
 Keshava (film), a 2017 Telugu film